"Comin' Down" is a song by American singer Paula Cole, from her fourth studio album, Courage. It was released in 2007.

Background
"Comin' Down" was released as the second single from her fourth studio album, Courage. The song consists of genre pop. The song never entered the Billboard charts.

Track listing
 CD single

"Comin' Down" - 4:01

Personnel
 Drums: Jay Bellerose
 Guitar: Dean Parks
 Photography: Fabrizio Ferri
 Producer: Bobby Colomby
 Vocals: Paula Cole
 Writer: Dean Parks, Paula Cole

References

2007 singles
Paula Cole songs
Songs written by Paula Cole
Songs written by Dean Parks
2007 songs
Decca Records singles